Events from the year 1925 in the United States.

Incumbents

Federal Government 
 President: Calvin Coolidge (R-Massachusetts)
 Vice President: vacant (until March 4), Charles G. Dawes (R-Illinois) (starting March 4)
 Chief Justice: William Howard Taft (Ohio)
 Speaker of the House of Representatives: Frederick H. Gillett (R-Massachusetts) (until March 4), Nicholas Longworth (R-Ohio) (starting December 7)
 Senate Majority Leader: vacant (until March 4), Charles Curtis (R-Kansas) (starting March 4)
 Congress: 68th (until March 4), 69th (starting March 4)

Events

January–March

January 5 – Nellie Tayloe Ross becomes Governor of Wyoming, the first female governor in the United States. Twelve days later, Miriam A. Ferguson becomes first female governor of Texas.
 January 27 – February 1 – The 1925 serum run to Nome (the "Great Race of Mercy") relays diphtheria antitoxin by dog sled across the U.S. territory of Alaska, to combat an epidemic.
 February 21 – First issue of The New Yorker magazine is published by Gaven Sydnes.
 March 4 – Calvin Coolidge becomes the first President of the United States to have his inauguration broadcast on radio. Charles G. Dawes is sworn in as Vice President of the United States.
 March 15 – The Phi Lambda Chi fraternity (original name "The Aztecs") is founded on the campus of Arkansas State Teacher's College in Conway, Arkansas (now the University of Central Arkansas).
 March 18 – The Tri-State Tornado rampages through Missouri, Illinois, and Indiana, killing 695 people and injuring 2,027. It hits the towns of Murphysboro, Illinois; Gorham, Illinois; Ellington, Missouri; and Griffin, Indiana.  The storm's damage path was indicated at 378 km (235 mi).
 March 21 – Tennessee Governor Austin Peay signs the Butler Act, prohibiting the teaching of evolution in the state's public schools.
 March 31 – Radio station WOWO in Ft. Wayne, Indiana begins broadcasting.

April–June
 April 1 – Frank Heath and his horse Gypsy Queen leave Washington, D.C. to begin a two-year journey to visit all 48 states.
 April 10 – F. Scott Fitzgerald publishes The Great Gatsby.
 April 18 – University of Miami chartered in Coral Gables, Florida.
 May 5 – Scopes Trial: Dayton, Tennessee, biology school teacher John Scopes is arrested for teaching Charles Darwin's Theory of Evolution.
 May 8 – African American Tom Lee rescues 32 people from the M.E. Norman, a steamboat sinking in the Mississippi.
 June 6 – The Chrysler Corporation is founded by Walter Percy Chrysler.
 June 13 – Charles Francis Jenkins achieves the first synchronized transmission of pictures and sound, using 48 lines, and a mechanical system. A 10-minute film of a miniature windmill in motion is sent across 5 miles from Anacostia to Washington, D.C. The images are viewed by representatives of the National Bureau of Standards, the U.S. Navy, the Department of Commerce, and others. Jenkins calls this "the first public demonstration of radiovision".
 June 27 – The 6.6  Montana earthquake affects the central part of the state with a maximum Mercalli intensity of VIII (Severe). Because the affected area is mostly rural, financial losses are limited to $150,000, though the damage is considered severe.
 June 29 – The 6.8  Santa Barbara earthquake affects the central coast of California with a maximum Mercalli intensity of IX (Violent), destroying much of downtown Santa Barbara, California and leaving 13 people dead.

July–September
 July 10 – Scopes Trial: In Dayton, Tennessee, the so-called "Monkey Trial" begins with John T. Scopes, a young high school science teacher, accused of teaching evolution in violation of a Tennessee state law.
 July 21 – Scopes Trial: In Dayton, Tennessee, high school biology teacher John T. Scopes is found guilty of teaching evolution in class and fined $100.
 August 14 – The original Hetch Hetchy Moccasin Powerhouse is completed and goes on line.
 September 3 – The U.S. Navy dirigible Shenandoah breaks up in a squall line over Ohio en route to Scottfield, St. Louis; 14 crewmen are killed.
 September 1 to 30 – In the first year for which statewide data are reliable, this month with a statewide average water equivalent of  remains Alaska's wettest calendar month on record.

October–December
 October 15 – The Pittsburgh Pirates defeat the Washington Senators, 4 games to 3, to win their 2nd World Series Title.
 November 21 – Lava Beds National Monument is established.
 November 28 – The weekly country music radio program Grand Ole Opry is first broadcast on WSM radio in Nashville, Tennessee, as the "WSM Barn Dance".
 December 16 – Alpha Phi Omega, a national service fraternity, is founded at Lafayette College.

Undated
 New York City becomes the largest city in the world, taking the lead from London.
 The motel concept originates with the Motel Inn of San Luis Obispo, California, originally called the Milestone Mo-Tel, constructed by Arthur Heineman.
 The National Football League adds 5 teams: the New York Giants, Detroit Panthers, Providence Steam Roller, a new Canton Bulldogs team, and the Pottsville Maroons.
 Calvin Coolidge signs into law the act establishing a U.S. Probation and Pretrial Services System.
 First National Spelling Bee.

Ongoing
 Lochner era (c. 1897–c. 1937)
 U.S. occupation of Haiti (1915–1934)
 Prohibition (1920–1933)
 Roaring Twenties (1920–1929)

Births

January

 January 1 
 Charlie Capps, American politician (d. 2009)
 Mary Nesbitt Wisham, American baseball player (d. 2013)
 January 2 – Larry Harmon, American entertainer and television producer (d. 2008)
 January 4 – Henry Gleitman, American academic (d. 2015)
 January 6 – John DeLorean, American car maker (d. 2005)
 January 7 – Harry Stradling Jr., American cinematographer (d. 2017)
 January 8 – Tharon Musser, American designer (d. 2009)
 January 9 – Lee Van Cleef, American actor (d. 1989)
 January 10 – Elizabeth Virginia Hallanan, American judge (d. 2004)
 January 11
 Betty Bumpers, childhood immunizations activist (d. 2018)
 William Styron, American writer (d. 2006)
 January 12 
 Bill Burrud, American child star, television host and producer (d. 1990)
 Katherine MacGregor, American actress (d. 2018)
 January 13
 Rosemary Murphy, American actress (d. 2014)
 Nat Peck, American jazz trombonist (d. 2015)
 C. O. Simpkins Sr., American dentist, civil rights activist and politician (d. 2019)
 Gwen Verdon, American actress and dancer (d. 2000)
 January 15 – Ruth Slenczynska, American pianist 
 January 16   
 Harold "Slim" Switzer, child actor (d. 1967)
 Jesse J. Taylor, United States Navy naval aviator (d. 1965)
 January 17 
 Duane Hanson, American sculptor (d. 1996)
 Edgar Ray Killen, Ku Klux Klan leader and convicted murderer (d. 2018)
 January 18 – Art Paul, American graphic designer (d. 2018)
 January 21 – Charles Aidman, American actor (d. 1993)
 January 22 – Bobby Young, American professional baseball player (d. 1985)
 January 24 – Maria Tallchief, American ballerina (d. 2013)
 January 25 – Barbara Carroll, American jazz pianist (d. 2017)
 January 26
 Joan Leslie, American actress (d. 2015)
 Paul Newman, American actor, entrepreneur and philanthropist (d. 2008)
 January 29 
 Harold C. Agerholm, soldier, posthumous Medal of Honor recipient (killed in action 1944 in the Mariana Islands)
 Dub Garrett, American football player (d. 1976)
 Robert W. McCollum, American epidemiologist (d. 2010)
 January 30 – Douglas Engelbart, pioneer in human–computer interaction (d. 2013)
 January 31 – Benjamin Hooks, American civil rights activist, minister, and attorney (d. 2010)

February

 February 1
 Gus Stavros, American businessman and philanthropist (d. 2022)
 John F. Yardley, American aeronautical engineer (d. 2001)
 February 2 – Elaine Stritch, American actress (d. 2014)
 February 3 
 Shelley Berman, American comedian (d. 2017)
 John Fiedler, American actor (d. 2005)
 February 8 – Jack Lemmon, American actor and film director (d. 2001)
 February 9
 John B. Cobb, American theologian and philosopher 
 Billy Williamson, American musician (d. 1996)
 February 11
 Virginia E. Johnson, American sexologist (d. 2013)
 Kim Stanley, American actress (d. 2001)
 Marvin Stein, American comics artist, animator and illustrator (d. 2010)
 February 15 
 Angella D. Ferguson, American pediatrician
 Jerome Waldie, American politician (d. 2009)
 February 17 – Hal Holbrook, American actor (d. 2021)
 February 18 – George Kennedy, American actor (d. 2016)
 February 20 – Robert Altman, American film director (d. 2006)
 February 21 – Sam Peckinpah, American film director (d. 1984)
 February 22
 Edward Gorey, American illustrator and writer (d. 2000)
 Gerald Stern, American poet, essayist and educator (d. 2022)
 February 23 – Patricia Broderick, American playwright and painter (d. 2003)
 February 24 – Bud Day, United States Air Force colonel (d. 2013)
 February 25
 Maddy English, American female baseball player (d. 2004)
 Lisa Kirk, American actress and singer (d. 1990)
 February 26
 Arthur S. Abramson, American linguist (d. 2017)
 Lefty Kreh, American sports photojournalist, author and sport fisherman (d. 2018)
 Dave Pell, American jazz musician (d. 2017) 
 Robert F. Williams, African-American civil rights activist and author (d. 1996)
 February 27
 Samuel Dash, Watergate Congressional counsel (d. 2004)
 Ed Quirk, American football player (d. 1962)
 February 28 – Louis Nirenberg, Canadian-American mathematician (d. 2020)

March
 March 1 – Keith Harvey Miller, American politician (d. 2019)
 March 4 – Dale Barnstable, American basketball player (d. 2019)
 March 6 – Clyde Biggers, American football coach (d. 1976)
 March 7 – Rene Gagnon, U.S. Marine (d. 1979)
 March 8 – John Harland Bryant, American physician (d. 2017)
 March 9 – G. William Miller, American politician (d. 2018) 
 March 12 – G. William Whitehurst, American politician 
 March 13 
 Roy Haynes, American jazz drummer 
 John Tate, American mathematician (d. 2019) 
 March 14 – Joseph A. Unanue, American chief executive (d. 2013)
 March 15 – Art Murakowski, American football player (d. 1985)
 March 16 – Mary Hinkson, African-American dancer and choreographer (d. 2014)
 March 19 – Brent Scowcroft, American general and diplomat 
 March 20 – Romana Acosta Bañuelos, American public servant (d. 2018)
 March 23 – Robie Lester, American Grammy-nominated voice artist and singer (d. 2005)
 March 25 – Flannery O'Connor, American author (d. 1964)
 March 28 – Dorothy DeBorba, American child actress (d. 2010) 
 March 31 – John Wesley Hanes III, American civil servant (d. 2018)

April
 April 2 – Hard Boiled Haggerty, professional wrestler and actor (died 2004)
 April 3 – Jan Merlin, actor, screenwriter and author (died 2019)
 April 5 – Donald Burgett, writer and World War II veteran (died 2017)
 April 9 – Frank J. Shakespeare, diplomat and media executive (died 2022)
 April 12
 Evelyn Berezin, computer engineer (died 2018)
 Ned Miller, country music singer-songwriter (died 2016)
 April 14
 Gene Ammons, jazz saxophonist (died 1974)
 Rod Steiger, film actor (died 2002)
 April 17 
 Charles Yanofsky, American geneticist (died 2018)
 Mallory Horne, American politician (died 2009)
 April 18 – Bob Hastings, actor (died 2014)
 April 19 
 Chuck Klausing, American football player and coach (died 2018)
Hugh O'Brian, actor (died 2016)
 April 20
 Ernie Stautner, German-born American football player died 2006)
 Elena Verdugo, actress (d. 2017)
 Bob Will, Olympic rower (died 2019)
 April 24 – Faye Dancer, baseball player (died 2002)
 April 25 – Kay E. Kuter, actor (died 2003)
 April 27 – Joey LaMotta, boxer and manager (died 2020)
 April 28 – John Thorn, headmaster, author and educational consultant

May

 May 1 
 Scott Carpenter, American astronaut (d. 2013)
 Anna May Hutchison, American professional baseball player (d. 1998)
 May 4 – Maurice R. Greenberg, American businessman
 May 5
 Charles Chaplin Jr., American actor (d. 1968)
 Edwin Michael Kosik, American judge (d. 2019)
 May 10 
 Pete Babando, American ice hockey player (d. 2020)
 Stephen Bechtel Jr., American businessman and engineer (d. 2021)
 May 11 
William Glasser, American psychiatrist and author (d. 2013)
Edward Zemprelli, American politician (d. 2017)
 May 12 – Yogi Berra, American baseball player (d. 2015)
 May 14
 Sophie Kurys, American professional baseball player (d. 2013)
 Patrice Munsel, American actress, singer and operatic soprano (d. 2016)
 Oona O'Neill, American actress (d. 1991)
 Marvin Traub, American businessman and writer (d. 2012)
 May 16
 James F. Holland, American physician (d. 2018)
 Nancy Roman, American astronomer (d. 2018)
 May 17 – Herb Henson, American country musician (d. 1963)
 May 19 – Malcolm X, African-American Muslim minister and human rights activist (d. 1965)
 May 21 – Frank Kameny, American gay rights activist (d. 2011)
 May 23
 Mac Wiseman, American bluegrass musician (d. 2019)
 Joshua Lederberg, American molecular biologist, recipient of the Nobel Prize in Physiology or Medicine (d. 2008)
 May 27 – Frank Dempsey, American football player (d. 2013)
 May 28 – Lucien Nedzi, American politician
 May 29 – Thomas Collier Platt Jr., American judge (d. 2017)
 May 31 
 Julian Beck, American actor, director, poet and painter (d. 1985)
 Thomas Murphy, American broadcasting executive (d. 2022)

June

 June 3 – Tony Curtis, American actor (d. 2010)
 June 5
 Warren Frost, American actor (d. 2017)
 Bill Hayes, American actor and singer 
 June 6 – Fitzhugh L. Fulton, American pilot (d. 2015)
 June 7
 John Biddle, American yachting cinematographer (d. 2008)
 Robert Smithdas, deaf-blind teacher, advocate and author (d. 2014)
 June 8
 Barbara Bush, born Barbara Pierce, First Lady of the United States (d. 2018)
 Del Ennis, American baseball player and coach (d. 1996)
 Eddie Gaedel, American baseball player with dwarfism (d. 1961)
 June 9
 Herman Sarkowsky, German-American businessman and executive (d. 2014)
 Robert H. Traurig, American lawyer and businessman (d. 2018)
 June 10 – Nat Hentoff, American historian, novelist, jazz and country music critic, and syndicated columnist (d. 2017)
 June 11 – William Styron, American writer (d. 2006)
 June 12 – Richard Paul Conaboy, American judge (d. 2018)
 June 14 – Pierre Salinger, American politician (d. 2004)
 June 16 – Lewis Morley, American photographer (d. 2013)
 June 17 – Alexander Shulgin, American psychopharmacologist (d. 2014)
 June 19 – Wendell Erickson, American politician (d. 2018)
 June 20 – Audie Murphy, American World War II hero and actor (d. 1971)
 June 21
 Stanley Moss, American poet, publisher, and art dealer
 Maureen Stapleton, American actress (d. 2006)
 June 22
 Nat Boxer, American sound engineer (d. 2009)
 Ben Jarvis, American politician (d. 2018)
 June 23
 June 23
 Benjamin Abeles, American physicist (d. 2020)
 Clay Evans, American pastor (d. 2019)
 Art Modell, American businessman (d. 2012)
 Oliver Smithies, British-American geneticist (d. 2017)
 June 24 – Ogden R. Reid, United States Representative from New York (d. 2019)
 June 25
 John Briley, American writer (d. 2019)
 June Lockhart, American actress
 Virginia Patton, American actress (d. 2022)
 Robert Venturi, American architect (d. 2018)
 June 26 – Richard X. Slattery, American actor (d. 1997)
 June 27
 Fiora Contino, American opera conductor (d. 2017)
 Doc Pomus, born Jerome Solon Felder, songwriter (d. 1991)
 Wayne Terwilliger, American baseball player, coach and manager (d. 2021)
 June 28 – Ray Boyle, American actor
 June 29
 Francis S. Currey, American Medal of Honour recipient (d. 2019)
 John Fujioka, American actor of Japanese descent (d. 2018)
 Shirley Brannock Jones, American judge (d. 2019)
 Arthur Storch, American actor and stage director (d. 2013)
 Cara Williams, American actress
 June 30 – Fred Schaus, American basketball player, head coach and athletic director (d. 2010)

July

 July 1
 Farley Granger, American actor (d. 2011)
 Art McNally, American football referee
 July 2 
 Marvin Rainwater, American country and rockabilly singer and songwriter (d. 2013)
 Medgar Evers, African-American civil rights activist (d. 1963)
 July 3 – Danny Nardico, American professional boxer (d. 2010)
 July 4
 Cathy Berberian, American mezzo-soprano and composer (d. 1983)
 John Imbrie, American paleoceanographer (d. 2016)
 Max Pievsky, American politician
 July 6
 Merv Griffin, American game show host and producer,  talk show host, singer (d. 2007)
 Bill Haley, American pop singer (d. 1981)
 July 7
 Marc Breslow, American television director (d. 2015)
 Jud Kinberg, American producer and screenwriter (d. 2016)
 July 8
 Arthur Imperatore Sr., Italian-American businessman from New Jersey (d. 2020)
 Sidney Kramer, American politician (d. 2022)
 Bill Mackrides, American football quarterback (d. 2019)
 July 9 – Mary de Rachewiltz, American poet and translator 
 July 10 
 Ernest Bertrand Boland, Roman Catholic bishop
 Mildred Kornman, American actress and model (d. 2022)
 Jerome Kohlberg Jr., businessman (d. 2015)
 July 11
 Mattiwilda Dobbs, African-American coloratura soprano (d. 2015)
 Peter Kyros, American politician (d. 2012)
 July 12 – William Benner Enright, judge (d. 2020)
 July 14 
 Bruce L. Douglas, politician 
 Sheila Guyse, African-American singer, actress, and recording artist (d. 2013) 
 July 15 
 Evan Hultman, politician and attorney 
 D. A. Pennebaker, documentary filmmaker (d. 2019)
 July 18
 Windy McCall, American relief pitcher in Major League Baseball (d. 2015)
 Glen Wood, American race car driver (d. 2019)
 July 19 – Sue Thompson, American pop and country music singer
 July 22
 Irving Sandler, art critic, art historian and educator (d. 2018)
 Joseph Sargent, film director (d. 2014)
 July 23 – Gloria DeHaven, American actress (d. 2016)
 July 25 – Benny Benjamin, musician, known as the main drummer used by Motown for studio recordings (d. 1969)
 July 29 – Arnie Ferrin, basketball player (d. 2022)
 July 31
 Harry Malmberg, American second baseman and coach (d. 1976)
 Carmel Quinn, Irish-American singer and performer (d. 2021)

August
 August 1 – Roy Mackal, biologist (d. 2013)
 August 12 
 Dale Bumpers, politician (d. 2016)
 Lois Jurgens, convicted murderer (d. 2013)
 Dean Sensanbaugher, American football halfback and defensive back (d. 2005)
 August 13 – Benny Bailey, bebop and hard-bop jazz trumpeter (d. 2005)
 August 14 – Russell Baker, writer (d. 2019)
 August 15
 Mike Connors, actor (d. 2017)
 Ruth Lessing, female professional baseball player (d. 2000) 
 Bill Pinkney, performer and singer (d. 2007) 
 August 16 
 Mal Waldron, jazz pianist, composer and arranger (d. 2002)
 William G. Hundley, criminal defense attorney (d. 2006)
 Kirke Mechem, composer
 August 19 – Frederic Richards, biochemist and biophysicist (d. 2009)
 August 29 – Earle Brucker, Jr., baseball player (d. 2009)
 August 31
 Ted Schwinden, politician 
 Pete Vonachen, restaurateur and baseball team owner (d. 2013)

September

 September 1 – Arvonne Fraser, American women's rights activist (d. 2018)
 September 2 – Ike Franklin Andrews, American politician (d. 2010)
 September 3 – Hank Thompson, American country musician (d. 2007)
 September 8 – Jacqueline Ceballos, American feminist 
 September 10 – Dick Lucas, American minister and cleric
 September 12
 Stan Lopata, American professional baseball player (d. 2013)
 Dick Moore, American child actor (d. 2015)
 September 13
 Marshall Flaum, American television director, producer and screenwriter (d. 2010)
 Mel Tormé, American musician (d. 1999)
 September 15 – Peggy Webber, American actress
 September 16
 Martha Firestone Ford, American businesswoman 
 Eugene Garfield, American linguist and businessman (d. 2017)
 B.B. King, African-American blues guitarist (d. 2015)
 Morgan Woodward, American actor (d. 2019)
 September 17 – Dorothy Loudon, American actress, singer (d. 2003)
 September 19 – Franklin Sousley, U.S. Marine flag raiser on Iwo Jima (d. 1945)
 September 20 – Bobby Nunn, R&B singer (d. 1986)
 September 25 
 Edwin N. Lightfoot, American chemical engineer (d. 2017)
 Paul B. MacCready, Jr., American aeronautical engineer (d. 2007)
 September 26 – Marty Robbins, American singer-songwriter and racing driver (d. 1982)
 September 28 – Carolyn Morris, American female professional baseball player (d. 1996)
 September 29 – John Tower, American politician (d. 1991)

October

 October 2 – Paul Goldsmith, American NASCAR driver
 October 3
 Gore Vidal, American writer (d. 2012)
 George Wein, American pianist and producer (d. 2021)
 October 5
 Gail Davis, American actress (d. 1997)
 Robert Burren Morgan, American politician (d. 2016)
 October 6 – Hiroshi H. Miyamura, American Medal of Honor recipient (d. 2022)
 October 7 – Mildred Earp, American baseball player (d. 2017)
 October 8 – Eleanor Anne Young, American religious sister, research scientist, and educator (d. 2007)
 October 10
 Anne Pippin Burnett, American classics scholar (d. 2017)
 Thomas F. Stroock, American politician (d. 2009)
 October 11 – Elmore Leonard, American novelist (d. 2013)
 October 13 – Lenny Bruce, comic (d. 1966)
 October 15 – Ted Lerner, American real estate developer and baseball team owner (d. 2023)
 October 16 – Daniel J. Evans, American politician
 October 20
 Art Buchwald, American humorist and columnist (d. 2007)
 Gene Wood, American game show announcer (d. 2004)
 October 22 – Robert Rauschenberg, American painter (d. 2008)
 October 23 – Johnny Carson, American comedian and television host (d. 2005)
 October 24 – Al Feldstein, American comic book artist (d. 2014)
 October 25 – John J. Snyder, Roman Catholic bishop (d. 2019)
 October 27 – Warren Christopher, American diplomat (d. 2011)
 October 29 – Dominick Dunne, American writer (d. 2009)
 October 31 – Robert Rheault, American army officer (d. 2013)

November

 November 4 – Doris Roberts, American actress (d. 2016)
 November 6 – Fred B. Rooney, American politician (d. 2019)
 November 7 – Angelo Thomas Acerra, Roman Catholic bishop (d. 1990)
 November 11 
 Donald M. Blinken, American businessman and diplomat (d. 2022)
 H. Jack Geiger, American physician and civil rights activist. (d. 2020)
 Jonathan Winters, American actor and comedian (d. 2013)
 November 15 – Howard Baker, American politician (d. 2014)
 November 17 
 Jean Faut, American baseball player (d. 2023)
 Rock Hudson, American film actor (d. 1985)
 Walt Peregoy, American artist (d. 2015)
 November 18 – Gene Mauch, American baseball manager (d. 2005)
 November 20
 Kaye Ballard, American actress, comedian (d. 2019)
 Robert F. Kennedy, American politician and Attorney General of the United States (d. 1968)
 November 22
 Carla Balenda, American actress
 Gunther Schuller, American musician (d. 2015)
 November 23
 Gene Brito, American football defensive end (d. 1965)
 Maria di Gerlando, American operatic soprano (d. 2010)
 Johnny Mandel, American composer and conductor (d. 2020)
 November 24 – William F. Buckley, Jr., American journalist (d. 2008)
 November 26 – Eugene Istomin, American classical pianist (d. 2003)
 November 27 – Marshall Thompson, American actor (d. 1992)
 November 28
 Grace Berg Schaible, American lawyer and politician (d. 2017)
 Herb Wallerstein, American director and producer (d. 1985)
 November 29
 Naomi Stevens, American actress (d. 2018)
 "Sunshine" Sonny Payne, American radio presenter (d. 2018) 
 November 30
 Maryon Pittman Allen, American politician and journalist (d. 2018)
 Donald Collins, American politician (d. 2018)
 Bill Gates Sr., American attorney, philanthropist and author (d. 2020)
 Burt Gustafson, American athlete and sports coach (d. 2022)

December

 December 1 – Martin Rodbell, American biochemist, recipient of the Nobel Prize in Physiology or Medicine (d. 1998)
 December 2 – Julie Harris, American actress (d. 2013)
 December 8
 Sammy Davis Jr., African American singer, dancer, musician and actor (d. 1990)
 Hank Thompson, player in the Negro leagues and Major League Baseball (d. 1969)
 December 11
 Aaron Feuerstein, American businessman and philanthropist 
 John R. Gorman, American Roman Catholic bishop
 Paul Greengard, American neuroscientist, recipient of the Nobel Prize in Physiology or Medicine (d. 2019)
 December 13 
 John Ehle, American writer (d. 2018)
 Dick Van Dyke, American actor, singer, dancer and comedian 
 December 15 – Kasey Rogers, American actress (d. 2006)
 December 19 – Robert B. Sherman, American songwriter (d. 2012)
 December 21
 John Harlan, American game show announcer (d. 2017)
 Dorothy Kamenshek, American baseball player (d. 2010)
 December 23 – Harry Guardino, American actor (d. 1995)
 December 25
 Ned Garver, American professional baseball pitcher (d. 2017)
 Dorothy Mueller, American baseball player (d. 1985)
 December 26 – Jimmy Roselli, American singer (d. 2011)
 December 27 – Wilson Frost, American politician (d. 2018)
 December 29 – Pete Dye, American golf course architect (d. 2020)
 December 30 – Shirley Herz, American Broadway theatre press representative (d. 2013)
 December 31 – Dick Manville, American baseball player (d. 2019)

Deaths
 January 4 – Nellie Cashman, Irish-born prospector (born 1845)
 January 5 – Alexander D. Henderson, businessman (born 1865)
 January 8 – George Bellows, realist painter (born 1882)
 January 20 – Grace Meigs Crowder, physician and public health official (born 1881)
 January 22 – Fanny Bullock Workman, geographer, writer and mountain climber (born 1859)
 January 26 – Caspar F. Goodrich, admiral (born 1847)
 January 31 – George Washington Cable, novelist (born 1844)
 February 1 – Ellen Hamlin, Second Lady of the United States as wife of Hannibal Hamlin (born 1835)
 February 7 – Edward Jobson, actor (born 1860)
 February 18 – James Lane Allen, fiction writer (born 1849)
 February 23 – Samuel Berger, Olympic boxer (born 1884)
 March 4 – John Montgomery Ward, baseball player (born 1860)
 March 10 – Myer Prinstein, Olympic long jumper (born 1878 in Poland)
 March 13 – Lucille Ricksen, silent film actress (born 1910)
 March 14 – Walter Camp, American football coach (born 1859)
 March 30 – William J. McConnell, U.S. Senator from Idaho from 1890 to 1891 (born 1839)
 April 8 – Emma Curtis Hopkins, spiritual writer (born 1849)
 April 13 – Elwood Haynes, inventor (born 1857)
 April 14 – John Singer Sargent, portrait painter (born 1856 in Florence; died in London)
 April 19 – John Walter Smith, politician (born 1845)
 May 12 – Amy Lowell, poet (born 1874)
 May 15 – Nelson A. Miles, general (born 1839)
 May 20 – Elias M. Ammons, Governor of Colorado (born 1860)
 May 25 – Henry W. Petrie, popular music composer (born 1857)
 June 1 – Thomas R. Marshall, 28th Vice President of the United States from 1913 to 1921 (born 1854)
 June 2 – James Ellsworth, mineowner and banker (born 1849)
 June 16 – Emmett Hardy, jazz cornet player (born 1903; TB)
 June 18 – Robert M. La Follette, politician (born 1855)
 June 26 – James A. Barber, Medal of Honor recipient (born 1841)
 July 7 – Clarence Hudson White, photographer (born 1871)
 July 26 – William Jennings Bryan, lawyer and politician (born 1860)
 July 29 – Mark Fenton, silent film actor (born 1866)
 August 4 – Charles W. Clark, baritone (born 1865)
 August 5 – Jennie Lee, silent film actress (born 1848)
 August 7 – George Gray, U.S. Senator from Delaware from 1885 to 1899 (born 1840)
 August 16 – Edna Hicks, blues singer (born 1895; killed in fire)
 August 17 – Junius George Groves, slave-born potato farmer (born 1859)
 September 13 – Emily Elizabeth Holman, architect (born 1854)
 September 17 – Carl Eytel, painter of the Southwest (born 1862 in Württemberg)
 October 7 – Christy Mathewson, baseball player (born 1880)
 October 10 – James Buchanan Duke, tobacco and electric power industrialist (born 1856)
 October 17 – John I. Beggs, businessman (born 1847)
 November 1 – Lester Cuneo, actor (born 1888)
 November 3 – Lucile McVey, silent film comedy actress (born 1890)
 November 21 – Robert Wrenn, tennis player (born 1873)
 December 7 – James O. Barrows, actor (born 1855)
 December 8 – Marguerite Marsh, silent film actress (born 1888)
 December 22 – Mary Thurman, silent film actress (born 1895)
 December 28 – Raymond P. Rodgers, admiral (born 1849)
 December 31 – J. Gordon Edwards director (born 1867 in Canada)

See also
 List of American films of 1925
 Timeline of United States history (1900–1929)

References

External links
 

 
1920s in the United States
United States
United States
Years of the 20th century in the United States